Lehman is a surname. The Lehman family was prominent in finance in the United States.  Notable people with the surname include:

Albert Lehman, American Olympic medalist lacrosse player
Bruce Lehman (born 1945), American patent lawyer
David Lehman (born 1948), American poetry editor
Emery Lehman (born 1996), American Olympic speed skater
Emanuel Lehman (1827–1907), one of the three founding brothers of the investment bank Lehman Brothers
Ernest Lehman (1915–2005), American screenwriter
F. K. Lehman (1924–2016), American anthropologist
Harry Lehman (1935-2022), American lawyer and politician
Henry Lehman (1822–1855), one of the three founding brothers of the investment bank Lehman Brothers
Herbert Henry Lehman, American politician, New York State governor and senator
Hughie Lehman (1885–1961), Canadian ice hockey player
Irving Lehman (1876–1945), New York State lawyer and judge
Jeffrey S. Lehman (born 1956), former president of Cornell University
Jean-Pierre Lehman (1914-1981), French paleontologist
John F. Lehman, American banker
Ken Lehman (1928–2010), American baseball player and coach
Kristin Lehman (born 1970), Canadian actress
Leo Lehman (1926–2005), British-German screenwriter (in Germany as Leo Lehmann)
Manny Lehman, professor at Middlesex University
Manny Lehman, house music DJ and producer
Matt Lehman, American politician from Indiana
Mayer Lehman (1830–1897), one of the three founding brothers of the investment bank Lehman Brothers
Michael A. Lehman (1943-2017), American politician
Philip Lehman (1861–1947), American banker
Phillip Lehman (born 1965), Franco-American graffiti artist known as Bando
Richard Lehman (CIA officer) (1923–2007), American CIA officer
Robert Lehman (1891–1969), American banker (and son of Philip Lehman)
Robin Lehman, American cinematographer (and son of Robert Lehman)
Siegfried Lehman (1892–1958), German-born Israeli educator
Teddy Lehman (born 1981), American football player
Tom Lehman (born 1959), American golfer
Val Lehman (born 1943), Australian actress
William Lehman (Florida politician) (1913–2005), American congressional representative

German-language surnames
Germanic-language surnames
Levite surnames
Jewish surnames
Yiddish-language surnames